Maria Sharapova and Tamarine Tanasugarn were the defending champions, but none competed this year.

Virginia Ruano Pascual and Paola Suárez won the title by defeating Jill Craybas and Marlene Weingärtner 6–1, 6–7(1–7), 6–3 in the final.

Seeds

Draw

Draw

Qualifying

Seeds

Qualifiers
  Ekaterina Bychkova /  Emma Laine

Qualifying draw

References
 Official results archive (ITF)
 Official results archive (WTA)

2004 Doubles
SEAT Open - Doubles
2004 in Luxembourgian tennis